Frederick Murray may refer to:

 Frederick Murray (rugby union) (1871–1952), New Zealand rugby union player
 Fred Murray (coach) (–1954), American football and basketball coach
 Feg Murray (1894–1973), American track athlete
 Frederick James Alexander Murray (1907–1954), Surinamese politician
 Fred Murray (born 1982), Irish footballer